Rugrats Adventure Game is an educational adventure point and click video game based on the Rugrats television series released for Microsoft Windows and Macintosh on September 30, 1998. It was developed and published by Broderbund (then a subsidiary of The Learning Company). The game follows Tommy Pickles and friends Chuckie, Phil, and Lil as they try to rescue Tommy's beloved toy Reptar from being thrown out as garbage. The game incorporates point and click gameplay, with characters and objects appearing in different locations even after the player has visited them once. Angelica, the series' main antagonist, appears in the game to help further the story and ultimately become the game's main villain.

Rugrats Adventure Game is the first in a series of video games based on the Rugrats series, preceding Rugrats Activity Challenge and Rugrats Mystery Adventures on PC.

Plot and gameplay
The plot sees evil alien Queen Angeleeka (Angelica) kidnap the mighty Reptar (Tommy's action figure), and the main characters' goal is to rescue Reptar so he can defeat the Queen. This plot is contextualised as the imagination of the babies, and the game itself is set in Tommy's family home. The three overarching tasks are to find a way to get outside, to find a way to reach Reptar in the trash bin outside, and to find a way to scare away Hubert the trash monster.

The game is a standard adventure title that plays like an interactive episode of the cartoon—even getting an in-game title of "Reptar vs. the Aliens", after the in-universe TV film the babies were watching at the beginning of the game—where the player collects items, interacts with characters, and solves puzzles to advance. The game aims to teach problem-solving, strategy, critical thinking, logical reasoning, memory, and mouse and keyboard skills.

Production
Rugrats Adventure Game was released with two companion CD-ROMs entitled Rugrats Movie Activity Challenge and Rugrats Print Shop on September 30, 1998, in anticipation of The Rugrats Movie. The Learning Company president said, "The unprecedented strength and breadth of the Rugrats franchise offers us the opportunity to promote the Rugrats CD-Roms on a broader scale and with much greater impact than our competition." Broderbund held a promotion where the purchase of any Rugrats title from November 1998 to June 1, 1999, would give consumers 20% off a second Broderbund kid's product. As part of a cross-promotion, 200 copies of the game were available as second prize in a scratch-n-win sweepstakes by Simon and Schuster Children's Division, which sold Rugrats books.

Critical reception
AllGame recommended that players sit with their kids to help them if they get stuck. MacHome described it as being "extensive and richly animated", and a mix between Myst and a Huggies commercial. Just Adventure felt it was a fantastic title to develop computer skills and a love of adventure games within youth. Hartford Courant liked the game's "playful" graphics and music. CBS News conducted a children playtest of the three Rugrats CD-ROMs and found them all to be "winners". The Boston Globe praised the variety of the three CD-ROMs. Boston Herald called Rugrats Adventure Game a "waste of money and time". The Baltimore Sun said the game's requirement to get items in a certain order is frustrating and that it slows down the pace. The Washington Post deemed it "silly" and "fun". Los Angeles Daily News praised the title's educational skill-building. The Los Angeles Times found the main characters' "mangling of the English language" to be grating. Kiplinger's Finance felt it was "convenient" that the title was tied to the theatrical film. PC Direct liked the game's mix of comedy, madcap antics, and puzzles.

The game was nominated for a 1999 Interactive Achievement Award for Computer Children's Entertainment Title of the Year, ultimately losing to Disney/Pixar's A Bug's Life Action Game.

Rugrats Adventure Game was among the best-selling PC games of October 1998, and was 9th-best-selling home education software for 1999.

References

External links
 
 
 

1998 video games
Broderbund games
Adventure games
Classic Mac OS games
Rugrats and All Grown Up! video games
Video games developed in the United States
Windows games
Children's educational video games
Klasky Csupo video games